Ken Rosewall defeated Rod Laver in the final, 6–3, 6–1, 2–6, 6–2 to win the men's singles tennis title at the 1968 French Open. It was Rosewall's second French title, and his fifth Grand Slam tournament title overall. The tournament was the first major of the Open Era, in which professionals were allowed to compete against amateurs. Rosewall and Laver, who had not appeared in a Grand Slam major since 1956 and 1962 respectively, were among those no longer barred from entering. 

Roy Emerson was the defending champion, but lost in the quarterfinals to Pancho Gonzales.

Missing from the tournament were WCT's "Handsome Eight" and top amateurs Manuel Santana, Arthur Ashe, Clark Graebner and Tom Okker. It was future champion Ilie Năstase's first major appearance.

Seeds

  Rod Laver (final)
  Ken Rosewall (champion)
  Andrés Gimeno (semifinals)
  Roy Emerson (quarterfinals)
  Pancho Gonzales (semifinals)
  Fred Stolle (second round)
  Lew Hoad (first round, withdrew)
  Bob Hewitt (third round)
  Ion Țiriac (quarterfinals)
  Wilhelm Bungert (first round, withdrew)
  Nicola Pietrangeli (first round, withdrew)
  István Gulyás (fourth round)
  Cliff Richey (fourth round)
  Ray Ruffels (fourth round)
  Jan Kodeš (first round, withdrew)
  Alex Metreveli (first round, withdrew)

Qualifying

Draw

Finals

Top half

Section 1

Section 2

Section 3

Section 4

Bottom half

Section 5

Section 6

Section 7

Section 8

External links

1968 French Open – Men's draws and results at the International Tennis Federation

Men's Singles
French Open by year – Men's singles
French